Colman Dock, also called Pier 52, is the primary ferry terminal in Seattle, Washington, United States.  The original pier is no longer in existence, but the terminal, now used by the Washington State Ferry system, is still called "Colman Dock".

Location

Originally Colman Dock was located at the foot of Columbia Street, and was immediately to the north of Pier 2.  Before 1910, the wharf immediately to the north of Colman dock was used by the West Seattle ferry.  In 1910 this wharf was replaced with the Grand Trunk Pacific dock. In 1964 the entire area was used for the much larger ferry terminal dock which exists today.

History

Pier 52 was historically known as Colman Wharf. The original Colman Dock was built by Scottish engineer James Colman in 1882 for the Oregon Improvement Company's coal bunkers. It burned with most of the rest of the city in the Great Seattle Fire of 1889, but was quickly rebuilt. This expansion was designed by the Seattle architectural firm Beezer Brothers.

Colman also set up a company, the Colman Dock Company, to conduct the dock's business affairs.  Following the merger of the La Conner Transportation Company, headed by Joshua Green (1869–1975), with the Puget Sound Navigation Company (PSN), headed by Charles E. Peabody (1857–1926) the Colman Dock Company, and the Colman Dock itself, came under PSN control.  In 1910, PSN was approaching monopoly control over the inland steamship routes of western Washington, with the company's most serious challenger being the Kitsap County Transportation Company (KCTC), headed by Kitsap County businessman Warren L. Gazzam (1864–1961).  The rivalry between the two companies became almost a personal matter between Green and Gazzam.  In 1910, Green, having obtained control of Colman Dock, and engaged in a rate war with KCTC, ordered KCTC not to land its boats at Colman Dock.  KCTC then moved several piers north, to the Galbraith, Bacon dock.

Colman Dock was seriously damaged when, on the night of April 25, 1912, the steel-hulled ship Alameda accidentally set its engines "full speed ahead" instead of reversing, and slammed into the dock. The dock tower fell into the bay and the sternwheeler Telegraph was sunk. The clock was salvaged, as was the Telegraph, and the dock was reconstructed with a new tower. No one died in the Alameda accident, but a less dramatic accident the following month proved fatal. On May 19, 1912, a gangplank collapsed as passengers were boarding the Black Ball steamer Flyer. At least 60 people fell into the water. One woman and one child died.

In 1917, Colman Dock was owned and operated by Colman Dock Company, with B. P. Morgan as manager. Colman Dock was the terminal of the Puget Sound Navigation Company, the Merchants Transportation Company, and several Puget Sound shipping lines. In 1917 an overhead walk (still in existence in 1983) led from the Seattle business district to the waiting room, from which most of the Puget Sound steamship passenger traffic originated. There were also adjustable passenger gangplanks and adjustable freight slips. In 1917 Colman Dock was equipped with a Barlow marine elevator. Colman Dock could accommodate 14 Puget Sound steamboats at one time. There were offices on the north side of the overhead walk.

In the mid-1930s Puget Sound Navigation Company modernized Colman Dock, using an Art Deco style that matched their streamlined signature ferry .

In 1935, Colman Dock became the Seattle terminal for what had been the Alki–Manchester ferry when the dock at Alki Point washed out.

In 1951, Washington State bought out PSNC and took over the ferry system. The state paid $500,000 for the ferry terminal at Colman Dock.

Work on the present terminal began a decade later; there have been several reconfigurations and modernizations since. The very month that the state ferry terminal opened, it was the subject of another accident. The Kalakala, which had recently been voted Seattle's second biggest attraction after the then-new Space Needle, rammed the terminal February 21, 1966. Though dramatic, the damage proved not to be severe. The ferry needed only minor repairs and was back in service the next day. Repairs to the slip cost $80,000 and took two months to complete.

The clock from the old Colman Dock tower, dunked into the bay in the 1912 Alameda accident and removed in the 1936 renovation, was rediscovered (lying in pieces) in 1976, purchased by the Port of Seattle in 1985, restored, given as a gift to the Washington State Department of Transportation, and reinstalled on the present Colman Dock on May 18, 1985.

Current status

Two ferry routes currently depart from Colman Dock: the Seattle–Bainbridge Island ferry and the Seattle–Bremerton ferry.

Two passenger-only ferry systems, the King County Water Taxi and Kitsap Fast Ferries, operate out of a separate facility at Pier 50 on the south side of Colman Dock. The water taxi serves West Seattle, Vashon Island, while the Fast Ferries serve Bremerton and Kingston. From 2017 to 2019, passenger ferries used a temporary passenger-only dock at the north side of Pier 52. The new Pier 50 facility opened on August 12, 2019, with a covered waiting area that can hold 500 people. A pedestrian overpass will connect it to the Washington State Ferries facility when it opens in 2020.

Redevelopment

The first phase of the new terminal building opened on September 15, 2019. The remainder of the  main building was opened in November 2022 and can hold up to 1,900 passengers in the waiting area, which has 362 seats and twelve turnstiles. Construction of an entry building with retail and connections to a rebuilt pedestrian overpass is expected to last until 2023.

The pedestrian bridge, built parallel to Marion Street at the site of the former overpass, began construction in July 2022 and is scheduled to be completed in mid-2023. The new bridge is expected to cost $6.3 million with funding from WSDOT and the city government. A section of the former bridge along the north side of the Commuter Building was demolished in late 2020 following the opening of a temporary bridge above Western Avenue and Columbia Street.

Notes

References

See also
 Colman Building

History of King County, Washington
Piers in Seattle
Central Waterfront, Seattle
Ferry terminals in the United States
Washington State Ferries